Arulanandham Solomon Johnson (1899 – 1972) was the first Indian Psychiatrist. He received his BA from University of Madras in 1917, and completed his MBBS from Madras Medical College in 1922. He went on to pursue MD from University of Edinburgh and was the first doctor from South India to become a member of Membership of the Royal Colleges of Physicians of the United Kingdom and Membership of the Royal Colleges of Physicians of the United Kingdom. He also co-founded the Indian Psychiatric Society in 1947 in Delhi.

Personal life
A.S. Johnson was born on 1899 as the only child to Arulanandham Solomon of PeraniVilai, Palliyadi. Solomon hailed from a highly respected family and served as the first Indian Secretary of YMCA in 1888. His elder Brother Rev. Arulanandham Nathaniel, a renowned Evangalist served the  C.S.I Church Kanjiracode, Marthandam  as its First pastor for 32 Years.  In addition, Solomon also served as the first secretary and first Choir Master of C.S.I Mateer Memorial Church, Trivandrum. Johnson's paternal cousin brother is G.D. Boaz. The family with over two hundred years of recorded history has been one of the oldest leading noble families of South Travancore 
and Kanniyakumari District.

Career

A.S. Johnson started his career in 1931 at Maudsley Hospital, London. Under the invitation of the then King of Travancore Shri. Chithira Thirunal Balarama Varma he returned to India in 1933 and revived the Trivandrum Mental Hospital, Oolampara serving as the chief surgeon of Travancore. In the backdrop of World War - I, he was called to serve in the Indian Army, as a surgeon, from 1941 to 1948. From 1949 to 1956, he served as the Chief Medical Superintendent of Government General Hospital, Egmore and then Kilpauk Mental Hospital, Madras. It was during his tenure the hospital was expanded from 16 bed to 800 beds, making it the largest Mental Hospital in Asia.

References 

People from Kanyakumari district
1899 births
1972 deaths
Indian medical educators
Indian medical writers
University of Madras alumni